Hrvoje Plum (born 28 May 1994) is a Croatian footballer who plays as a midfielder for Glentoran.

Career
Plum started his senior career with Osijek. In 2013, he signed for Lokomotiva in the Croatian First Football League, where he made nine appearances and scored zero goals. After that, he played for Crotian clubs Cibalia and Dugopolje.

On 6 July 2019, Plum signed for NIFL Premiership side Glentoran and further extended his contract with the club for another year in January 2020.

References

External links
 
 Hrvatski nogometni savez Profile 
 Glentoran FC Profile

1994 births
Living people
Sportspeople from Vinkovci
Association football midfielders
Croatian footballers
Croatia youth international footballers
NK Sesvete players
NK Lokomotiva Zagreb players
HNK Cibalia players
NK Dugopolje players
NK Osijek players
Glentoran F.C. players
First Football League (Croatia) players
Croatian Football League players
NIFL Premiership players
Croatian expatriate footballers
Expatriate association footballers in Northern Ireland
Croatian expatriate sportspeople in Northern Ireland